The Rogožarski PVT (transliterated as Rogozarski PWT in German and as Rogojarsky PVT in some older English sources) was a single-engined, two-seat parasol winged aircraft designed as an advanced and fighter trainer in Yugoslavia before World War II.  Over 60 were built, serving with the Yugoslav Royal Air Force (YAF) until the fall of Yugoslavia in 1941.  After that, some PVTs were used by the newly formed Air Force of the Independent State of Croatia, sometimes as ground attack aircraft.

Design and development

The Prva Srpska Fabrika Aeroplana Živojin Rogožarski was the first Serbian aircraft manufacturer in Yugoslavia, founded in 1924.  In about 1933 its team of Rudolf Fizir, Sima Milutinović, Kosta Sivčev and Adem Biščević designed the PVT, a training aircraft with tandem open cockpits in an oval wooden monocoque fuselage.  Its wooden, canvas covered wings were swept and parasol mounted well above the fuselage with pairs of lift struts to the lower fuselage and a central inverted V cabane.  They carried long narrow chord ailerons, with prominent spades well clear of the upper surfaces.

The PVT was powered by a 420 hp (313 kW) 7-cylinder radial Gnome-Rhône 7K radial engine, housed with its cylinder heads exposed and driving a two-bladed propeller.  The fixed, divided type undercarriage had on each side a main shock absorber leg, its upper end attached to a steel pyramid protruding from the mid-fuselage keeping the leg closer to the vertical whilst providing a wide track.  Each wheel was connected to the lower fuselage with a swinging V-strut.  A simple tail skid completed the undercarriage. The horizontal tail and fixed fin were both canvas covered wooden structures, though the moving surfaces, also canvas covered, had metal frames.  The tailplane was strut braced to the fuselage from below and wire braced above to the fin.  It carried elevators which were spade assisted like the ailerons but also horn balanced.  The unbalanced rudder was broad and rounded.

Operational history

The PVT prototype probably first flew in 1934.  An initial production batch of 20 aircraft was delivered to the YAF during 1936.  Another 40 were delivered during 1938–1939, of which the last 10 had fixed 7.7 mm (0.303 in) forward-firing machine guns fitted and were powered by a licence-built version of the Gnôme-Rhône 7K engine, the IAM K7. More PVTs were under construction at the time of the Italo-German invasion of Yugoslavia in April 1941. Fifteen PVTs captured by the Germans as a result were presented to the newly formed Air Force of the Independent State of Croatia.  Later some of these were fitted with bomb racks and used as attack aircraft until 1945.

A few PVTs, designated PVT-H, (the H from hidro) were configured as seaplanes on standard Edo (EDO Float Model 38) floats mounted on N-shaped struts. During 1938 and 1939, four PVT-H aircraft were delivered to the Yugoslav Royal Navy.

Operators

Royal Yugoslav Air Force 61 aircraft
Yugoslav Royal Navy

Air Force of the Independent State of Croatia   15 ex-Royal Yugoslav Air Force

Specifications

See also

Notes

References

External links

Rogozarski PVT
Rogozarski PVT

PVT
1930s Yugoslav military aircraft
Trainer aircraft
Floatplanes
Parasol-wing aircraft
Single-engined tractor aircraft
Aircraft first flown in 1934